Pineberry is a white strawberry cultivar with red seeds and a pineapple-like flavor.

Description
Pineberry is a hybrid. cross from Fragaria chiloensis and Fragaria virginiana. When ripe, it is almost completely white, but with red achenes (the seeds). The plant is disease-resistant, and highly priced, although not profitable due to small-scale farming, small berry size and low yield. Pineberries are harvested in the spring and summer. First identified in South America around 2002, pineberries are cultivated in Belgium and exported from the Netherlands.

Marketing
The berry was dubbed "pineberry" for the UK market where it became available in 2010 to reflect its pineapple-like flavor while appearing to be a strawberry. Pineberries were first sold commercially in the United States in 2012, and were marketed to restaurants, bakeries and wholesale markets in Europe and Dubai.

See also
Fragaria nilgerrensis, a wild species of no commercial value that has white fruit

References

Strawberry cultivars
Hybrid fruit